The 2009 Knoxville Challenger was a professional tennis tournament played on indoor hard courts. It was the sixth edition of the tournament which was part of the 2009 ATP Challenger Tour. It took place in Knoxville, United States between 9 and 15 November 2009.

Singles main-draw entrants

Seeds

 Rankings are as of November 2, 2009.

Other entrants
The following players received wildcards into the singles main draw:
  Ryan Harrison
  Kaden Hensel
  Dénes Lukács
  Rhyne Williams

The following players received entry from the qualifying draw:
  Jamie Baker
  Ričardas Berankis
  Richard Bloomfield
  Raven Klaasen
  Michael McClune (LL)

Champions

Singles

 Taylor Dent def.  Ilija Bozoljac, 6–3, 7–6(6)

Doubles

 Martin Emmrich /  Andreas Siljeström def.  Raven Klaasen /  Izak van der Merwe, 7–5, 6–4

External links
Official website
ITF Search 
2009 Draws

2009 ATP Challenger Tour
2009
2009 in American tennis
2009 in sports in Tennessee